Spring Creek Colony is a census-designated place (CDP) and Hutterite colony in McPherson County, South Dakota, United States. It was first listed as a CDP prior to the 2020 census. The CDP had a population of 229 at the 2020 census.

It is in the northeast part of the county,  by road north-northeast of Leola, the county seat. The closest community is Forbes, North Dakota,  to the northeast.

Demographics

References 

Census-designated places in McPherson County, South Dakota
Census-designated places in South Dakota
Hutterite communities in the United States